Sir James Fraser Stoddart  (born 24 May 1942) is a British-American chemist who is Board of Trustees Professor of Chemistry and head of the Stoddart Mechanostereochemistry Group in the Department of Chemistry at Northwestern University in the United States. He works in the area of supramolecular chemistry and nanotechnology.  Stoddart has developed highly efficient syntheses of mechanically-interlocked molecular architectures such as molecular Borromean rings, catenanes and rotaxanes utilising molecular recognition and molecular self-assembly processes.  He has demonstrated that these topologies can be employed as molecular switches. His group has even applied these structures in the fabrication of nanoelectronic devices and nanoelectromechanical systems (NEMS). His efforts have been recognized by numerous awards including the 2007 King Faisal International Prize in Science. He shared the Nobel Prize in Chemistry together with Ben Feringa and Jean-Pierre Sauvage in 2016 for the design and synthesis of molecular machines.

Education and early life
Fraser Stoddart was born in Edinburgh, Scotland, on 24 May 1942. He was brought up as a tenant farmer on Edgelaw Farm, a small community consisting of three families, and received early schooling at the local village school in Carrington, Midlothian, before going on to Melville College in Edinburgh. He was awarded a Bachelor of Science degree in 1964 followed by a Doctor of Philosophy in 1967 from the University of Edinburgh the latter for research on natural gums in Acacias supervised by Edmund Langley Hirst and D M W Anderson.

Career
In 1967, he went to Queen's University (Canada) as a National Research Council Postdoctoral Fellow, and then, in 1970, to the University of Sheffield as an Imperial Chemical Industries (ICI) Research Fellow, before joining the academic staff as a lecturer in chemistry. In 1978, he was transferred to the ICI Corporate Laboratory where he first started investigating the mechanically interlocked molecules that would eventually become molecular machines. He was a Science Research Council Senior Visiting Fellow at the University of California, Los Angeles (UCLA) in 1978. After spending a sabbatical (1978–81) at the ICI Corporate Laboratory in Runcorn, England, he returned to Sheffield where he was promoted to a Readership in 1982.

He was awarded a Doctor of Science degree from the University of Edinburgh in 1980 for his research into stereochemistry beyond the molecule. In 1990, he moved to the Chair of Organic Chemistry at the University of Birmingham and was Head of the School of Chemistry there (1993–97) before moving to UCLA as the Saul Winstein Professor of Chemistry in 1997, succeeding Nobel laureate Donald Cram.

In July 2002, he became the Acting Co-Director of the California NanoSystems Institute (CNSI). In May 2003, he became the Fred Kavli Chair of NanoSystems Sciences and served from then through August 2007 as the Director of the CNSI.

During 35 years, nearly 300 PhD students and postdoctoral researchers have been trained in his laboratories.

In 2008, he established the Mechanostereochemistry Group and was named Board of Trustees Professor in Chemistry at Northwestern University.

In 2016, he shared the Nobel Prize in Chemistry together with Ben Feringa and Jean-Pierre Sauvage for the design and synthesis of molecular machines. In 2017, Stoddart was appointed a part-time position at the University of New South Wales to establish his New Chemistry initiative at the UNSW School of Chemistry. In 2019, Sir Fraser Stoddart introduced a premium skin care brand called "Noble Panacea", which utilizes aspects of his work.

Research
Stoddart is one of only a few chemists of the past quarter century to pioneer a new field in organic chemistry.  By establishing a new field where the main feature is mechanical bonds he has paved the way for molecular recognition, self-assembly processes for template-directed mechanically interlocked syntheses, molecular switches, and motor-molecules. These advances have formed the basis of the fields of nanoelectronic devices, nanoelectromechanical systems, and molecular machines.

One of his major contributions to the development of mechanically-interlocked molecular architectures such as rotaxanes and catenanes has been the establishment of efficient synthetic protocols based on the binding of cyclobis(paraquat-p-phenylene) with electron-rich aromatic guests. His group reported the synthesis of an advanced mechanically interlocked molecular architecture called molecular Borromean rings through the use of dynamic covalent chemistry. The efficient procedures developed to synthesize these molecular architectures has been applied to the construction of molecular switches that operate based on the movement of the various components with respect to one another.  These interlocked molecules have potential uses as molecular sensors, actuators, amplifiers, and molecular switches, and can be controlled chemically, electrically, and optically.

Stoddart has pioneered the use of mechanically interlocked molecular architectures to create nanomechanical systems. He has demonstrated that such devices can be fabricated using a combination of the bottom-up approach of molecular self-assembly and a top-down approach of lithography and microfabrication.

Presentation style

Stoddart's papers and other material are instantly recognizable due to a distinctive "cartoon"-style of representation he has developed since the late 1980s. A solid circle is often placed in the middle of the aromatic rings of the molecular structures he has reported, and different colors to highlight different parts of the molecules. Indeed, he was one of the first researchers to make extensive use of color in chemistry publications. The different colors usually correspond to the different parts of a cartoon representation of the molecule, but are also used to represent specific molecular properties (blue, for example, is used to represent electron-poor recognition units while red is used to represent the corresponding electron-rich recognition units). The distinctive coloring has led to coining the term 'little blue box' for cyclophane, an important π-acceptor used to synthesize mechanically bonded structures. Stoddart maintains this standardized color scheme across all of his publications and presentations, and his style has been adopted by other researchers reporting mechanically interlocked molecules based on his syntheses.

ISI ratings
 Stoddart has an h-index of 130. He has published more than 1000 publications and holds at least ten patents. For the period from January 1997 to 31 August 2007, he was ranked by the Institute for Scientific Information as the third most cited chemist with a total of 14,038 citations from 304 papers at a frequency of 46.2 citations per paper.

The Institute for Scientific Information (ISI) predicted that Fraser Stoddart was a likely laureate of the 2003 Nobel Prize in Chemistry along with George M. Whitesides and Seiji Shinkai for their contributions to molecular self-assembly. However, the Prize eventually went to Peter Agre and Roderick MacKinnon.

Awards and honors
Stoddart was appointed a Knight Bachelor in the New Year's Honours December 2006, by Queen Elizabeth II. In 2007, he received the Albert Einstein World Award of Science in recognition for his outstanding and pioneering work in molecular recognition and self-assembly, and the introduction of quick and efficient template-directed synthetic routes to mechanically interlocked molecular compounds, which have changed the way chemists think about molecular switches and machines.

Memberships

2014 Membership, National Academy of Sciences, US
2012 Fellowship, American Academy of Arts and Sciences, US
2011 Honorary Fellowship, Royal Society of Chemistry, UK
2008 Honorary Fellowship, Royal Society of Edinburgh, UK
2006 Appointed Knight Bachelor by HM Queen Elizabeth II, UK
2006 Foreign membership, Science Division of the Royal Netherlands Academy of Arts and Sciences
2005 Fellowship, American Association for the Advancement of Science, US
1999 Fellowship, Academy of Natural Sciences (Leopoldina), Germany
1994 Elected a Fellow of the Royal Society of London, UK

Other awards and honours

2018 Fray International Sustainability Award 
2016 Nobel Prize in Chemistry
2016 Haworth Memorial Lectureship, Royal Society of Chemistry
2014 Centenary Prize Winner, Royal Society of Chemistry
2012 Distinguished Citizen Award, Illinois Saint Andrew Society, Chicago, US
2010 Royal Medal of the Royal Society of Edinburgh presented by Duke of Edinburgh
2008 Davy Medal of the Royal Society of London
2008 American Chemical Society Arthur C. Cope Award
2007 Feynman Prize in Nanotechnology (Experimental)
2007 Albert Einstein World Award of Science
2007 Tetrahedron Prize for Creativity in Organic Chemistry
2007 King Faisal International Prize in Science
2007 Jabir Ibn Hayyan (Geber) Medal (Saudi Chemical Society)
2005 University of Edinburgh Alumnus of the Year 2005 Award
2004 Nagoya Gold Medal in Organic Chemistry
1999 American Chemical Society Arthur C Cope Scholar Award
1993 International Izatt-Christensen Award in Macrocyclic Chemistry

Personal life
Stoddart is an American and British citizen. Stoddart married Norma Agnes Scholan, in 1968 until her death in 2004 from cancer and has two daughters. Norma Stoddart obtained a PhD in biochemistry and helped support the research efforts of her husband at the Universities of Sheffield, Birmingham, and California, Los Angeles.

Philanthropy
The Fraser and Norma Stoddart Prize for PhD students has been established at their alma mater, the University of Edinburgh. It was given for the first time in 2013.

References

External links
 
Sir James Fraser Stoddart on The Scientists' Channel

1942 births
People educated at Stewart's Melville College
Academics of the University of Sheffield
Albert Einstein World Award of Science Laureates
Alumni of the University of Edinburgh
Living people
Knights Bachelor
Nobel laureates in Chemistry
Imperial Chemical Industries people
Scottish chemists
21st-century American chemists
Scottish expatriates in the United States
University of California, Los Angeles faculty
Northwestern University faculty
Fellows of the Royal Society
Fellows of the American Academy of Arts and Sciences
Members of the United States National Academy of Sciences
Academics of the University of Birmingham
Fellows of the Royal Society of Edinburgh
Fellows of the Royal Society of Chemistry
Members of the Royal Netherlands Academy of Arts and Sciences
Scottish Nobel laureates
American Nobel laureates